John Usher (26 February 1859 – 9 August 1905) was an Irish first-class cricketer, who played one match for Yorkshire County Cricket Club in 1888.

Born in Templemore, County Tipperary, Ireland, Usher was a slow left arm orthodox spinner, who took two wickets for 31 runs, and scored seven runs at an average of 3.50, in his match against the MCC. The MCC won the game by 103 runs.

Usher died in August 1905 in Haslingden, Lancashire, England.

References

External links
Cricinfo Profile
Cricket Archive Statistics

1859 births
1905 deaths
Yorkshire cricketers
Sportspeople from County Tipperary
Irish cricketers